Kaverye is a rural locality (a selo) in Medvezhenskoye Rural Settlement, Semiluksky District, Voronezh Oblast, Russia. The population was 134 as of 2010. There are 3 streets.

Geography 
Kaverye is located 28 km north of Semiluki (the district's administrative centre) by road. Treshchevka is the nearest rural locality.

References 

Rural localities in Semiluksky District